Aliabad (also Romanized as ‘Alīābād; also known as ‘Alīābād-e Hīshīn) is a village in Rezvan Rural District, Jebalbarez District, Jiroft County, Kerman Province, Iran. At the 2006 census, its population was 35, in 7 families.

References 

Populated places in Jiroft County